Navalsaz is a little village located in La Rioja, Spain. Its population is about 3 or 4 people in winter, and 10 to 15 in summer. It is in the municipality of Enciso.

It is most known for being in the Dinosaur Route, beginning it in Herce.

An important zone in the village is El Calbario, where Los Pajares are placed, with some beautiful buildings with great people living there.

Historically, the economy of the village was based on sheep, but today perhaps tourism is the most important axis of employment in Navalsaz.

Navalsaz festival takes place at the end of July. However, you can find whatever you want about it asking in a bar of Enciso.

References

External links
Site of friends of Navalsaz

Municipalities in La Rioja (Spain)
Towns in Spain